I'd Tell You I Love You, But Then I'd Have to Kill You (2006) is a young adult fiction novel written by Ally Carter and is the first of seven books in the Gallagher Girls series. In October 2007, a sequel was released titled Cross My Heart and Hope to Spy.

Synopsis
The Gallagher Academy for Exceptional Young Women is a fairly typical all-girls school—that is, if every school teaches advanced martial arts in PE, chemistry always consists of learning about the latest in chemical warfare, and everyone breaks CIA codes for extra credit in computer class. So in truth, while the Gallagher Academy might say it’s a school for geniuses what they really mean is spies. But what happens when a Gallagher Girl falls for a boy who doesn’t have a code name?

Cammie Morgan may be fluent in fourteen languages and is very capable of killing a man with a few pieces of uncooked spaghetti, but the Gallagher Academy hasn't prepared her for what to do when she meets an ordinary boy who thinks she’s an ordinary girl. Sure, she can tap his phone, hack into his computer, and track him through a mall without him ever being the wiser, but can she have a regular relationship with a regular boy who can never know the truth about her? Cammie may be an elite spy in training, but in her sophomore year, she’s doing something riskier than ever—she’s falling in love.

Reception
Critical reception to I'd Tell You I Love You, But Then I'd Have to Kill You was mixed, with two reviewers for the School Library Journal giving differing opinions. One stated that the book "lacks the warmth and appeal of other teen while the other reviewer praised the book's unique voices, calling  it an "excellent choice for young teens". Publishers Weekly praised the book's tension while stating that they wished the character of Macey had been more fully developed (the character was more fully developed in later books). Common Sense Media wrote that the book was a "fun debut" without much controversial material.

Movie adaptation
I'd Tell You I Love You, But Then I'd Have to Kill You was initially optioned for film by Disney, with the option later being sold to Walden Media. In June 2009 the movie option expired. Carter announced in August 2013 that production company Tonik had optioned the series for film.

Plot
A young spy, Cammie Morgan, falls in love with a boy, Josh, but cannot reveal the truth about herself to him. This caused misunderstandings later on and they broke up in tears. In the end, Josh finds out about her being a spy, and all wrongs in the past had been corrected, and hope came back to Cammie.
But just as soon as Josh learned the truth, Cammie's mom gave Josh some serious tea that made him forget the truth about Cammie.

Series
The Gallagher Girls Series consists of seven books:

 I'd Tell You I Love You, But Then I'd Have to Kill You
 Cross My Heart and Hope to Spy
 Don't Judge a Girl by Her Cover
 Only the Good Spy Young
 Out of Sight, Out of Time
 United We Spy
 The Spies That Bind

The first six in the series follow one after the other while The Spies That Bind is an audiobook prequel that follows Cammie Morgan when she first started at The Gallagher Academy for Exceptional Young Women.

References

2006 American novels
American spy novels
American young adult novels
Junior spy novels
Novels by Ally Carter